The 2018–19 Kent State Golden Flashes women's basketball team represents Kent State University during the 2018–19 NCAA Division I women's basketball season. The Golden Flashes, led by third year head coach Todd Starkey, play their home games at the Memorial Athletic and Convocation Center, also known as the MAC Center, as members of the East Division of the Mid-American Conference. They finished the season 20–13, 11–7 in MAC play to finish in fourth place in the West Division. They advanced to the quarterfinals of the MAC women's tournament where they lost to Buffalo. They received an at-large bid to the WNIT where they defeated Green Bay in the first round before losing to Butler in the second round.

Roster

Schedule

|-
!colspan=9 style=| Exhibition

|-
!colspan=9 style=| Non-conference regular season

|-
!colspan=9 style=| MAC regular season

|-
!colspan=9 style=| MAC Tournament

|-
!colspan=9 style=| WNIT

See also
 2018–19 Kent State Golden Flashes men's basketball team

References

Kent State
Kent State Golden Flashes women's basketball seasons
Kent State
Kent State
Kent State